The blunt-winged warbler (Acrocephalus concinens) is a marsh-warbler (family Acrocephalidae). The species was first described by Robert Swinhoe in 1870. It was formerly included in the "Old World warbler" assemblage.

It is found in Afghanistan, Pakistan, Northeast India and China; it winters in Myanmar, Thailand and Bangladesh.

References

blunt-winged warbler
Birds of Afghanistan
Birds of China
Birds of Northeast India
Birds of Pakistan
blunt-winged warbler
Taxonomy articles created by Polbot